Ștefan Cârjan (10 May 1909 – 18 November 1978) was a Romanian football left winger and manager.

Life and career
He was born in Bucharest, in the Dracului neighborhood. Cârjan played over 20 years for Unirea Tricolor București, winning the 1940–41 Divizia A title as a player-coach. In 1947, after the Communist regime came in Romania, the Ministry of Internal Affairs wanted Unirea Tricolor to merge with Ciocanul București in order to found Dinamo București. Cârjan, together with the club's president Valeriu Negulescu and player-secretary Constantin Anghelache opposed the merger. All three of them were sent to jail for their past membership in or suspected sympathy for the fascist Iron Guard; in particular, Cârjan was accused of harboring Iron Guard members after their failed rebellion. Constantin Anghelache and former coach Gheorghe Constantin claimed the arrests were the result of their opposition to the merger. In 1948 Cârjan received a ten years sentence which was served in Jilava and Aiud. Historian Gheorghe Bodea claimed he also passed through Gherla, Pitești and Văcărești prisons. After finishing his sentence, because of his refusal to collaborate with the Communist regime, Cârjan was forced to work for four years at the cutting of the common reed from the Danube Delta.

After his death, in 1978, Cârjan's former player from Unirea Tricolor, Constantin Anghelache, who kept all his of his writings, released in 1996 the volume named În slujba unui rege – fotbalul (In the service of a king – football), which is a romanced presentation of Unirea Tricolor's history. He also had a manuscript which he wrote during his period spent as coach at Universitatea Cluj, which was released in two volumes. These are Ștefan Cârjan's volumes, which were released after his death:
 În slujba unui rege – fotbalul (In the service of a king – football) (1996)
 Însemnări despre "U" (Notes about "U") (2004)
 Ideea U (The U idea) (2011)

Honours

Player
Unirea Tricolor București
Divizia A: 1940–41
Divizia B: 1938–39
Cupa României runner-up: 1935–36, 1940–41

Manager
Unirea Tricolor București
Divizia A: 1940–41
Divizia B: 1938–39
Cupa României runner-up: 1940–41

References

External links
Ștefan Cârjan player profile at Labtof.ro
Ștefan Cârjan manager profile at Labtof.ro

1909 births
1978 deaths
Romanian footballers
Association football midfielders
Liga I players
Liga II players
Unirea Tricolor București players
Romanian writers
20th-century Romanian writers
Romanian male writers
20th-century Romanian male writers
Romanian football managers
FC Universitatea Cluj managers
Inmates of Aiud prison
Romanian prisoners and detainees
Footballers from Bucharest